Lucie Šafářová was the defending champion, but chose not to participate this year.

Seeds

Draw

Finals

Top half

Bottom half

External links
Main Draw and Qualifying draw

Singles